The Brick Public Schools are a comprehensive community public school district that serves students in pre-kindergarten through twelfth grade from Brick Township, in Ocean County, New Jersey, United States.

As of the 2020–21 school year, the district, comprised of 12 schools, had an enrollment of 8,414 students and 689.1 classroom teachers (on an FTE basis), for a student–teacher ratio of 12.2:1.

The district is classified by the New Jersey Department of Education as being in District Factor Group "DE", the fifth-highest of eight groupings. District Factor Groups organize districts statewide to allow comparison by common socioeconomic characteristics of the local districts. From lowest socioeconomic status to highest, the categories are A, B, CD, DE, FG, GH, I and J.

Schools
Schools in the district (with 2020–21 enrollment data from the National Center for Education Statistics) are:

Preschools
Herbertsville Preschool (147; PreK)
Walter Hrycenko, Principal
Warren H. Wolf Preschool (277; PreK; created for 2014-15 school year from Primary Learning Center)
Theresa Goodfellow, Principal
Elementary schools
Drum Point Elementary School (479; K-5)
Colleen Kerr, Principal
Lanes Mill Elementary School (560; K-5)
Jeffrey Luckenbach, Principal
Midstreams Elementary School (548; K-5)
Dr. John Billen, Principal
Osborneville Elementary School (402; K-5)
Michelle Cloud, Principal
Veterans Memorial Elementary School (647; K-5)
Ryan Blessing, Principal
Emma Havens Young Elementary School (732; K-5)
David Kasyan, Principal
Middle schools
Lake Riviera Middle School (861; 6-8)
Kevin Campbell, Principal
Veterans Memorial Middle School (965; 6-8)
Renee Kotsianas, Principal
High schools
Brick Memorial High School (1,410; 9-12)
Jonathan Barresi, Principal
Brick Township High School (1,314; 9-12)
William Kleissler, Principal

Administration
Core members of the district's administration are:
Dr. Thomas G. Farrell, Superintendent of Schools
James Edwards, Business Administrator / Board Secretary

Board of education
The district's board of education, comprised of seven members, sets policy and oversees the fiscal and educational operation of the district through its administration. As a Type II school district, the board's trustees are elected directly by voters to serve three-year terms of office on a staggered basis, with either two or three seats up for election each year held (since 2012) as part of the November general election. The board appoints a superintendent to oversee the district's day-to-day operations and a business administrator to supervise the business functions of the district.

References

External links
Brick Public Schools

School Data for the Brick Public Schools, National Center for Education Statistics

Brick Township, New Jersey
New Jersey District Factor Group DE
School districts in Ocean County, New Jersey